Teymuraz Gabashvili and Dennis Novikov were the defending champions but only Novikov chose to defend his title, partnering Christian Harrison. Novikov successfully defended his title.

Harrison and Novikov won the title after defeating Petros Chrysochos and Michail Pervolarakis 6–3, 6–3 in the final.

Seeds

Draw

References

External links
 Main draw

Cary Challenger - Doubles
2021 Doubles